Department of Social Services may refer to:
Alternative name for Child Protective Services in some U.S. jurisdictions
Department of Social Services (Australia)
Department of Social Services (1939–72), defunct Australian government department
Department of Social Services (Bangladesh)